Severino Andreoli (born 8 January 1941) is a retired Italian road cyclist. Competing as amateur in the 100 km team time trial, he won an Olympics silver medal and a world title in 1964. He then turned professional and won one stage of the Giro d'Italia in 1966. He rode the Tour de France in 1968.

References

1941 births
Living people
Italian male cyclists
Olympic silver medalists for Italy
Cyclists at the 1964 Summer Olympics
Olympic cyclists of Italy
Olympic medalists in cycling
Sportspeople from Verona
Medalists at the 1964 Summer Olympics
UCI Road World Champions (elite men)
Cyclists from the Province of Verona